H. A. Abdullah "Dollah" Hamid (born 15 February 1931) is a Singaporean field hockey player. He competed in the men's tournament at the 1956 Summer Olympics.

References

External links
 

1931 births
Possibly living people
Singaporean male field hockey players
Olympic field hockey players of Singapore
Field hockey players at the 1956 Summer Olympics
Place of birth missing (living people)
Singaporean people of Malay descent